Peracetic acid (also known as peroxyacetic acid, or PAA) is an organic compound with the formula CH3CO3H. This peroxy acid is a colorless liquid with a characteristic acrid odor reminiscent of acetic acid. It can be highly corrosive.

Peracetic acid is a weaker acid than the parent acetic acid, with a pKa of 8.2.

Production
Peracetic acid is produced industrially by the autoxidation of acetaldehyde:
O2 + CH3CHO → CH3CO3H

It forms upon treatment of acetic acid with hydrogen peroxide with a strong acid catalyst:
H2O2 + CH3CO2H  CH3CO3H + H2O
As an alternative, acetyl chloride and acetic anhydride can be used to generate a solution of the acid with lower water content.

Peracetic acid is generated in situ by  some laundry detergents. This is achieved by the action of bleach activators, such as tetraacetylethylenediamine and sodium nonanoyloxybenzenesulfonate, upon hydrogen peroxide formed from sodium percarbonate in water. The peracetic acid is a more effective bleaching agent than hydrogen peroxide itself. PAA is also formed naturally in the environment through a series of photochemical reactions involving formaldehyde and photo-oxidant radicals.

Peracetic acid is always sold in solution as a mixture with acetic acid and hydrogen peroxide to maintain its stability. The concentration of the acid as the active ingredient can vary.

Uses
The United States Environmental Protection Agency first registered peracetic acid as an antimicrobial in 1985 for indoor use on hard surfaces. Use sites include agricultural premises, food establishments, medical facilities, and home bathrooms. Peracetic acid is also registered for use in dairy and cheese processing plants, on food processing equipment, and in pasteurizers in breweries, wineries, and beverage plants. It is also applied for the disinfection of medical supplies, to prevent biofilm formation in pulp industries, and as a water purifier and disinfectant. Peracetic acid can be used as a cooling tower water disinfectant, where it prevents biofilm formation and effectively controls Legionella bacteria. A trade name for peracetic acid as an antimicrobial is Nu-Cidex.

In the European Union, peroxyacetic acid was reported by the EFSA after submission in 2013 by the US Department of Agriculture .

Decontamination kits for cleaning fentanyl analogues from surfaces (as used by many police forces, amongst others) often contain solid peracetyl borate, which mixes with water to produce peracetic acid.

Epoxidation
Although less active than more acidic peracids (e.g., m-CPBA), peracetic acid in various forms is used for the epoxidation of various alkenes (Prilezhaev reaction). Useful application are for unsaturated fats, synthetic and natural rubbers, and some natural products such as pinene. A variety of factors affect the amount of free acid or sulfuric acid (used to prepare the peracid in the first place).

Safety
Peracetic acid is a strong oxidizing agent and severe irritant to the skin, eyes, and respiratory system. The U.S. Environmental Protection Agency published the following Acute Exposure Guideline Levels (AEGL):

See also
Disinfectant
Hydroxyl
Organic peroxide
Peroxy acid
Trifluoroperacetic acid

References

Bleaches
Disinfectants
Organic peroxy acids
Foul-smelling chemicals